XETAC-AM/XHTAC-FM is a radio station on 1000 AM and 91.5 FM in Tapachula, Chiapas. The station carries the Exa FM format from MVS Radio.

History
XETAC received its concession in September 1984 and its FM combo in 1994. The AM transmitter is located in El Sacrificio.

The primary ownership of the station is held by México Radio, S.A. de C.V., the radio subsidiary of Organización Editorial Mexicana.

References

Radio stations in Chiapas